The British decimal five pence coin (often shortened to 5p in writing and speech)  is a denomination of sterling coinage worth  of a pound. Its obverse has featured the profile of Queen Elizabeth II since the coin’s introduction on 23 April 1968, replacing the shilling in preparation for decimalisation in 1971. It remained the same size as the one shilling coin, which also remained legal tender, until a smaller version was introduced in June 1990 with the older coins being withdrawn on 31 December 1990. Four different portraits of the Queen have been used, with the latest design by Jody Clark being introduced in 2015. The second and current reverse, featuring a segment of the Royal Shield, was introduced in 2008.

5p coins are legal tender up to the sum of £5 when offered in repayment of a debt; however, the coin's legal tender status is not normally relevant for everyday transactions.

The five pence coin was originally minted from cupro-nickel (75% Cu, 25% Ni), but since 2011    it has been minted in nickel-plated steel due to the increasing price of metal. From January 2013, the Royal Mint began a programme to gradually remove the previous cupro-nickel coins from circulation with replacement by the nickel-plated steel versions.

As of March 2014, an estimated 3,847 million 5p coins were in circulation with an estimated face value of £192.370 million.

Design 

To date, three different obverses have been used. In the original design, both sides of the coin are encircled by dots, a common feature on coins, known as beading.

As with all new decimal currency, until 1984 the portrait of Queen Elizabeth II by Arnold Machin appeared on the obverse, in which the Queen wears the 'Girls of Great Britain and Ireland' Tiara.

Between 1985 and 1997, the portrait by Raphael Maklouf was used, in which the Queen wears the George IV State Diadem.

On 27 June 1990 a reduced size version of the five pence coin was introduced. The older larger coins were withdrawn on 31 December 1990. The design remained unchanged.

As of June 2015, coins bearing the portrait by Jody Clark have been seen in circulation.

In August 2005 the Royal Mint launched a competition to find new reverse designs for all circulating coins apart from the £2 coin. The winner, announced in April 2008, was Matthew Dent, whose designs were gradually introduced into the circulating British coinage from mid-2008. The designs for the 1p, 2p, 5p, 10p, 20p and 50p coins depict sections of the Royal Shield that form the whole shield when placed together. The shield in its entirety was featured on the now-obsolete round £1 coin. The 5p coin depicts the centre of the Royal shield, showing the meeting point of the four quarters. The coin's obverse remains largely unchanged, but the beading (the ring of dots around the coin's circumference), which no longer features on the coin's reverse, has also been removed from the obverse.

Status as legal tender 
5p coins are legal tender for amounts up to and including £5. However, in the UK, "legal tender" has a very specific and narrow meaning which relates only to the repayment of debt to a creditor, not to everyday shopping or other transactions. Specifically, coins of particular denominations are said to be "legal tender" when a creditor must by law accept them in redemption of a debt. The term does not mean - as is often thought - that a shopkeeper has to accept a particular type of currency in payment. A shopkeeper is under no obligation to accept any specific type of payment, whether legal tender or not; conversely they have the discretion to accept any payment type they wish.

Mintages
Mintage figures below represent the number of coins of each date released for circulation. Mint Sets have been produced since 1982; where mintages on or after that date indicate 'none', there are examples contained within those sets.

References

External links

Royal Mint – 5p coin
Coins of the UK – Decimal 5p coins
Five Pence, Coin Type from United Kingdom

Coins of the United Kingdom
Currencies introduced in 1968
Five-cent coins